Vir is a settlement on the left bank of the Kamnik Bistrica River opposite Domžale in the Upper Carniola region of Slovenia.

A new parish church dedicated to Saint Joseph is being built in the settlement.

References

External links

Vir on Geopedia

Populated places in the Municipality of Domžale